The Pontiac Montana is a minivan that was sold by General Motors under the Pontiac brand for model years 1997 to 2009. Its badge-engineered variants were the Chevrolet Venture and the Oldsmobile Silhouette in the first generation, and the Chevrolet Uplander, Saturn Relay, and Buick Terraza in the second generation. Prior to the 1997 model year, it was known as the Pontiac Trans Sport.

In 1996 for the 1997 model year, the Trans Sport added the Montana moniker as part of an available trim package. This package proved so popular the line was renamed Montana in 1998 for the 1999 model year in the United States and 1999 for the 2000 model year in Canada. When the van was redesigned in 2004 for the 2005 model year, the name was changed to Montana SV6. It was discontinued after the 2006 model year in the United States because of slow sales, but continued to be sold in Canada and Mexico until 2009. Since their introduction, the Pontiac minivans were GM's most popular minivans among consumers in Canada.

The Doraville, Georgia assembly plant which produced the Montana and its siblings closed on September 26, 2008. Sales of the Montana SV6 continued for Canada and Mexico until 2009, a year before the Pontiac brand was discontinued in 2010.

First generation (1997)

The Montana nameplate was used as a trim level of the Pontiac Trans Sport van from 1997 to 1998. GM dropped the Trans Sport name for MY1999 (2000 in Canada) and the van simply became Montana. This generation was related to the first generation Buick GL8, the Chevrolet Venture, the Oldsmobile Silhouette, the Opel Sintra and the Vauxhall Sintra. The Opel and Vauxhall were only sold in Europe, although they were made in the same factory in the U.S. as the other U-body minivans. Chevrolet also introduced a nearly identical twin to Pontiac save for its badging for European consumers, named the Chevrolet Trans Sport. The 2000-2005 GL8 is similar to the first-generation Pontiac Montana, and the 2005-2016 GL8 is similar to the Pontiac Montana SV6. Both generations of the Buick GL8 minivans were only sold in China.

The Pontiac Montana came in both short- and long-wheelbase models. The Pontiac Montana was one of the few minivans which provided seating for eight. New for this generation were cabin air filters, and the filters can be accessed from behind an access panel easily accessed from inside the glove compartment.

For 2001, the Montana received a new steering wheel with the Pontiac logo which replaces the one with the PONTIAC letters. For 2003, the sport-style head restraints were dropped in favor of the conventional head restraints the Venture and Silhouette offered; and the anti-lock brakes became optional as well as for the Venture, but remained standard for the Silhouette before the demise of the Oldsmobile brand in 2004.

The Montana Thunder was the most up-level model of the Montana. Introduced in 2002, Thunder featured special "Thunder" badging, Thunder-specific 16" chrome 5-spoke wheels, upgraded ride and handling package, and a special spoiler on the back of the roof rack. Inside, the Montana Thunder had special two-tone black and grey leather seating, and a perforated leather-wrapped steering wheel. The Montana Thunder was produced in 2002 and 2003, but for 2004 it was made an optional package on Montana GTs called the "Chrome-Sport" package. Only the "Thunder" badges were discontinued.

Despite the Pontiac Montana's redesign in 2005, Pontiac continued to sell the original body style for the 2005 model year for fleet use. The last Montana rolled off the production line on March 31, 2004.

Safety criticism

A crash test video of the 1997 Trans Sport/Montana conducted by the Insurance Institute for Highway Safety (IIHS) resulted in some criticism due to extreme damage to the vehicle in the  moderate overlap crash test. The minivan received a "Poor" rating and was ranked the "Worst Performing Vehicle" by the institute as a result.

Some comments made by the IIHS after the first test in 1996 were:
 Major collapse of the occupant compartment left little survival space for the driver.
 Extreme steering wheel movement snapped the dummy's head backward.
 The unnatural position of the dummy's left foot indicates that an occupant's left leg would have been seriously injured in a real-world crash of this severity.
 The forces on the left lower leg were so high that the dummy's metal foot broke off at the ankle.

The safety issues of the Trans Sport/Montana were later addressed with the Montana SV6, which earned the highest rating of "Good" given by the institute in the frontal offset crash test.

The National Highway Traffic Safety Administration gave the van 4 stars for driver protection and 3 stars for passenger protection in the  frontal impact test. In the side impact test, it received 5 stars for front passenger protection, and 5 stars rear passenger protection.

Second generation (2005) 

For the 2005 model year, the Montana was restyled, with a higher, SUV-like front clip, while the name was extended to Montana SV6. For 2006, a 3.9 L LZ9 V6, with 240 hp (179 kW) and 240 lb·ft (332 Nm) torque, was added as an option, and the vehicle added GM badges to the front doors. For 2007, the 3.5 L V6 was dropped, leaving the 3.9 L as the base engine. Consequently, the optional AWD system was also dropped, since it could not handle the torque of the 3.9 L engine. A flex-fuel version of the 3.9 L V6 also became available for 2007, but was only available in Canada and Mexico for the SV6.

Similar to the Chevrolet Uplander, Saturn Relay, and Buick Terraza, it was the second-costliest of its cousins.  In the United States and Mexico only the long-wheelbase version was sold.

In Mexico, the Montana continued until the 2009 model year, with the 3.9 L V6 as the only engine option. General Motors marketed it as the Pontiac Montana SV6, and it was almost identical to the discontinued US version, but different from the Canadian-specification model. In some parts of Canada, unsold 2009 models were sold as 2010 models. Some of these were also adapted as city taxis in Toronto and Montreal starting in 2010.

Discontinuation
On November 21, 2005, GM announced that it would close the Doraville, Georgia assembly plant, which produced the SV6, in 2008.  However, several months later, GM announced that the SV6 would be discontinued after 2006 in the US due to poor sales, while production for both Canada and Mexico would continue because the SV6 sold better in those markets. The last SV6 for the U.S. market rolled off the assembly line on July 7, 2006. Production ended for Canada and Mexico with the 2009 model year, with the demise of the Pontiac brand and the closing of the Doraville, Georgia plant on September 26, 2008. The last vehicle built was a Canadian-bound Montana SV6 SWB with roof rack in Liquid Silver Metallic. It was delivered to the Marvin Starr dealership in Scarborough, Ontario.

With the discontinuation of the Pontiac brand in 2010, there are no direct replacements for the Montana SV6.

Sales

References

External links

Pontiac will get Cobalt-based entry-level coupe, lose Montana minivan, AutoWeek.com
Pontiac Montana Sv6 French site
Pontiac Montana Sv6 English site
2009 Pontiac Montana Sv6 Info
 2009 Pontiac Montana Sv6 GM Canada Media Release

All-wheel-drive vehicles
Front-wheel-drive vehicles
Minivans
Montana
2000s cars
Cars introduced in 1996
Motor vehicles manufactured in the United States
Cars of Canada